The 2014 Florida Gators baseball team represented the University of Florida in the sport of baseball during the 2014 college baseball season.  This was the Gators' 100th season of baseball. They competed in Division I of the National Collegiate Athletic Association (NCAA) and the Eastern Division of the Southeastern Conference (SEC).  They played their home games at Alfred A. McKethan Stadium on the university's Gainesville, Florida campus.  The team was coached by Kevin O'Sullivan, who was in his seventh season at Florida. The Gators entered the season looking to build upon their appearance in the 2013 NCAA Tournament, where they were eliminated after consecutive losses to Austin Peay and Valparaiso.

Roster

By player

By position

Coaches

Schedule

! style="background:#FF4A00;color:white;"| Regular Season
|- valign="top" 

|- bgcolor="#ddffdd"
|  || Maryland || No. 20 || McKethan Stadium || 4–0 || Poyner (1–0) || Stinnett (0–1) || Young (1) || 4,026 || 1–0 || –
|- bgcolor="#ffdddd"
| February 15 || Maryland || No. 20 || McKethan Stadium || 7–9 || Shawaryn (1–0) || Morales (0–1) || Mooney (1) || 3,900 || 1–1 || –
|- bgcolor="#ddffdd"
| February 16 || Maryland || No. 20 || McKethan Stadium || 8–58 || Hanhold (1–0) || Price (0–1) || Harris (1) || 3,742 || 2–1 || –
|- bgcolor="#ddffdd"
| February 18 || UCF || No. 20 || McKethan Stadium || 5–1 || Young (1–0) || Marotta (0–1) || None || 2,994 || 3–1 || –
|- bgcolor="#ddffdd"
| February 19 ||  || No. 20 || McKethan Stadium || 8–7 || Harris (1–0) || McMahon (0–1) || Anderson (1) || 2,740 || 4–1 || –
|- bgcolor="#ffdddd"
| February 21 || at No. 17 Rivalry || No. 20 || Coral Gables, FL || 4–6 || Diaz (2–0) || Poyner (1–1) || Garcia (1) || 3,481 || 4–2 || –
|- bgcolor="#ffdddd"
| February 22 || at No. 17 Miami (FL)Rivalry || No. 20 || Alex Rodriguez Park || 2–5 || Hammond (1–0) || Hanhold (1–1) || Garcia (2) || 4,076 || 4–3 || –
|- bgcolor="#ddffdd"
| February 23 || at No. 17 Miami (FL)Rivalry || No. 20 || Alex Rodriguez Park || 6–4 || Puk (1–0) || Suarez (1–1) || Hanhold (1) || 3,500 || 5–3 || –
|- bgcolor="#ffdddd"
| February 27 ||  || No. 23 || McKethan Stadium || 1–2 || Murray (2–0) || Shore (0–1) || Anderson (3) || 2,888 || 5–4 || –
|- bgcolor="#ffdddd"
| February 28 ||  || No. 23 || McKethan Stadium || 0–6 || Duchene (1–1) || Poyner (1–2) || None || 3,097 || 5–5 || –
|-

|- bgcolor="#ddffdd"
| March 1 || Florida Gulf Coast || No. 23 || McKethan Stadium || 4–0 || Whitson (1–0) || Deckert (1–2) || Rhodes (1) || 4,157  || 6–5 || –
|- bgcolor="#ffdddd"
| March 2 || Illinois || No. 23 || McKethan Stadium || 1–5 || Johnson (2–0) || Puk (1–1) || Jay (3) || 3,132 || 6–6 || –
|- bgcolor="#ddffdd"
| March 4 || vs.  ||  || Bayfront StadiumPensacola, FL|| 4–2 || Rhodes (1–0) || Johnson (0–2) || Harris (2) || 4,720 || 7–6 || –
|- bgcolor="#ddffdd"
| March 7 || Connecticut ||  || McKethan Stadium || 1–011 || Hanhold (2–1) || Ruotolo (1–2) || None || 2,535 || 8–6 || –
|- bgcolor="#ddffdd"
| March 8 || Connecticut ||  || McKethan Stadium || 2–110 || Poyner (2–2) || Slade (0–1) || None || 3,092 || 9–6 || –
|- bgcolor="#ddffdd"
| March 9 || Connecticut ||  || McKethan Stadium || 6–510 || Poyner (3–2) || Ruotolo (1–2) || None || 3,015 || 10–6 || –
|- bgcolor="#ddffdd"
| March 12 ||  ||  || McKethan Stadium || 13–5 || Young (2–0) || Learnard (1–2) || None || 2,603 || 11–6 || –
|- bgcolor="#ddffdd"
| March 14 || Arkansas ||  || McKethan Stadium || 2–1 || Shore (1–1) || Beeks (3–2) || Rhodes (2) || 3,120 || 12–6 || 1–0
|- bgcolor="#ddffdd"
| March 15 || Arkansas ||  || McKethan Stadium || 1–0 || Hanhold (3–1) || Killian (0–3) || Harris (3) || 3,557 || 13–6 || 2–0
|- bgcolor="#ffdddd"
| March 16 || Arkansas ||  || McKethan Stadium || 3–9 || Stone (3–0) || Puk (1–2) || Gunn (2) || 3,178  || 13–7 || 2–1
|- bgcolor="#ddffdd"
| March 18 || No. 1 Florida StateRivalry ||  || McKethan Stadium || 3–1 || Rhodes (2–0) || Miller (1–1) || Poyner (1) || 5,657 || 14–7 || 2–1
|- bgcolor="#ddffdd"
| March 21 || at  ||  || Olsen FieldCollege Station, TX || 5–311 || Puk (2–2) || Jester (2–1) || Rhodes (3) || 5,111 || 15–7 || 3–1
|- bgcolor="#ffdddd"
| March 22 || at Texas A&M ||  || Olsen Field || 4–5 || Long (3–0) || Hanhold (3–2) || Jester (3) || 5,726 || 15–8 || 3–2
|- bgcolor="#ffdddd"
| March 23 || at Texas A&M ||  || Olsen Field || 3–411 || Minter (1–0) || Rhodes (2–1) || None || 3,770 || 15–9 || 3–3
|- bgcolor="#ddffdd"
| March 25 || vs. No. 1 Florida StateRivalry ||  || Baseball GroundsJacksonville, FL || 4–1 || Young (3–0) || Miller (1–2) || Harris (4) || 10,125 || 16–9 || 3–3
|- bgcolor="#ddffdd"
| March 29 (1) || No. 4  ||  || McKethan Stadium || 2–1 || Rhodes (3–1) || Nola (5–1) || None || 2,998 || 17–9 || 4–3 
|- bgcolor="#ddffdd"
| March 29 (2) || No. 4 LSU ||  || McKethan Stadium || 6–2 || Shore (2–1) || Poche (5–2) || Poyner (2) || 2,860 || 18–9 || 5–3 
|- bgcolor="#ddffdd"
| March 30 || No. 4 LSU ||  || McKethan Stadium || 11–7 || Snead (1–0) || Person (1–1) || None || 4,012 || 19–9 || 6–3 
|-

|- bgcolor="#ffdddd"
| April 1 ||  || No. 20 || McKethan Stadium || 4–511 || Alexander (3–0) || Rhodes (3–2) || None || 2,904 || 19–10 || 6–3 
|- bgcolor="#ffdddd"
| April 4 || at No. 19 Kentucky || No. 20 || Cliff Hagan StadiumLexington, KY || 1–17 || Reed (6–1) || Hanhold (3–3) || None || 2,133 || 19–11 || 6–4
|- bgcolor="#ddffdd"
| April 5 || at No. 19 Kentucky || No. 20 || Cliff Hagan Stadium || 11–10 || Shore (3–1) || Shepherd (5–2) || Puk (1) || 1,992 || 20–11 || 7–4
|- bgcolor="#ffdddd"
| April 6 || at No. 19 Kentucky || No. 20 || Cliff Hagan Stadium || 8–9 || Dwyer (3–1) || Poyner (3–3) || Cody (2) || 1,920 || 20–12 || 7–5
|- bgcolor="#ddffdd"
| April 8 || at No. 1 Florida StateRivalry || No. 25 || Tallahassee, FL|| 8–0 || Young (4–0) || Strode (0–1) || None || 6,514  || 21–12 || 7–5
|- bgcolor="#ffdddd"
| April 11 || at No. 4 South Carolina || No. 25 || Carolina StadiumColumbia, SC|| 1–4 || Montgomery (5–2) || Shore (3–2) || Seddon (9) || 8,242 || 21–13 || 7–6
|- bgcolor="#ddffdd"
| April 12 || at No. 4 South Carolina || No. 25 || Carolina Stadium || 4–313 || Puk (3–2) || Seddon (1–1) || None || 8,242 || 22–13 || 8–6
|- bgcolor="#ddffdd"
| April 13 || at No. 4 South Carolina || No. 25 || Carolina Stadium || 6–5 || Dunning (1–0) || Crowe (6–2) || Hanhold (2) || 8,242 || 23–13 || 9–6
|- bgcolor="#ddffdd"
| April 15 || vs. Florida Gulf Coast || No. 18 || Hammond StadiumFort Myers, FL || 7–1 || Harris (2–0) || Anderson (2–2) || None || 3,493 || 24–13 || 9–6 
|- bgcolor="#ddffdd"
| April 18 ||  || No. 18 || McKethan Stadium || 3–2 || Shore (4–2) || Lawlor (3–3) || Poyner (3) || 3,355 || 25–13 || 10–6
|- bgcolor="#ddffdd"
| April 19 || Georgia || No. 18 || McKethan Stadium || 8–1 || Rhodes (4–2) || Tyler (4–3) || None || 3,596 || 26–13 || 11–6
|- bgcolor="#ddffdd"
| April 20 || Georgia || No. 18 || McKethan Stadium || 10–3 || Young (5–0) || Boling (3–4) || None || 3,046 || 27–13 || 12–6
|- bgcolor="#ffdddd"
| April 22 ||  || No. 12 || McKethan Stadium || 1–3 || Russell (5–2) || Harris (2–1) || McRae (1) || 2,535  || 27–14 || 12–6
|- bgcolor="#ffdddd"
| April 23 || Florida A&M || No. 12 || McKethan Stadium || 3–4 || Fleming (3–3) || Anderson (0–1) || Weeks (1) || 2,541 || 27–15 || 12–6
|- bgcolor="#ddffdd"
| April 25 || Missouri || No. 12 || McKethan Stadium || 7–1 || Shore (5–2) || Graves (3–3) || None || 3,744 || 28–15 || 13–6
|- bgcolor="#ddffdd"
| April 26 || Missouri || No. 12 || McKethan Stadium || 5–0 || Rhodes (5–2) || Anderson (2–3) || None || 2,925 || 29–15 || 14–6
|- bgcolor="#ddffdd"
| April 27 || Missouri || No. 12 || McKethan Stadium || 6–510 || Poyner (4–3) || Fairbanks (4–5) || None || 3,669 || 30–15 || 15–6
|-

|- bgcolor="#ddffdd"
| May 2 || at No. 20 Alabama || No. 12 || Tuscaloosa, AL || 7–3 || Shore (6–2) || Turnbull (5–4) || Hanhold (3) || 4,103 || 31–15 || 16–6
|- bgcolor="#ddffdd"
| May 3 || at No. 20 Alabama || No. 12 || Sewell–Thomas Stadium || 4–3 || Puk (4–2) || Kamplain (5–3) || Harris (5) || 4,191 || 32–15 || 17–6
|- bgcolor="#ddffdd"
| May 4 || at No. 20 Alabama || No. 12 || Sewell–Thomas Stadium ||  13–3 || Snead (2–0) || Keller (5–2) || None || 3,662 || 33–15 || 18–6
|- bgcolor="#ffdddd"
| May 6 ||  || No. 8 || McKethan Stadium || 2–4 || Barker (4–3) || Morales (0–2) || Kourtis (3) || 2,722  || 33–16 || 18–6
|- bgcolor="#ddffdd"
| May 8 || No. 10 Vanderbilt || No. 8 || McKethan Stadium || 1–0 || Shore (7–2) || Beede (7–6) || Poyner (4) || 2,803 || 34–16 || 19–6
|- bgcolor="#ffdddd"
| May 9 || No. 10 Vanderbilt || No. 8 || McKethan Stadium || 0–3 || Fulmer (4–1) || Dunning (1–1) || None || 4,112 || 34–17 || 19–7
|- bgcolor="#ffdddd"
| May 10 || No. 10 Vanderbilt || No. 8 || McKethan Stadium || 2–16 || Ferguson (3–3) || Whitson (1–1) || None || 3,289 || 34–18 || 19–8
|- bgcolor="#ddffdd"
| May 13 ||  || No. 13 || McKethan Stadium ||  8–2 || Snead (3–0) || Pardo (1–2) || None || 2,749 || 35–18 || 19–8
|- bgcolor="#ddffdd"
| May 15 || at  || No. 13 || Knoxville, TN || 5–4 || Harris (3–1) || Lee (4–4) || Snead (1) || 1,844 || 36–18 || 20–8
|- bgcolor="#ddffdd"
| May 16 (1) || at Tennessee || No. 13 || Lindsey Nelson Stadium || 4–2 || Puk (5–2) || Williams (5–5) || Snead (2) || 2,516 || 37–18 || 21–8
|- bgcolor="#ffdddd"
| May 16 (2) || at Tennessee || No. 13 || Lindsey Nelson Stadium || 5–7 || Cox (5–1) || Anderson (0–2) || Lee (4) || 2,396 || 37–19 || 21–9
|-

|-
! style="background:#FF4A00;color:white;"| Postseason
|-

|- bgcolor="#ffdddd"
|  || vs. No. 22 (9) Kentucky ||  || Hoover, AL ||  2–4 || Cody (4–0) || Shore (7–3) ||  || 7,526 || 37–20 || 0–1
|- bgcolor="#ddffdd"
| May 22 ||  || No. 12 (1) || Metropolitan Stadium || 7–2 || Poyner (5–3) || Wynkoop (7–5) || None || 5,115 || 38–20 || 1–1
|- bgcolor="#ddffdd"
| May 23 || vs. (5) Mississippi State || No. 12 (1) || Metropolitan Stadium ||  5–1 || Shafer (1–0) || Woodruff (1–3) || None || 8,790 || 39–20 || 2–1
|- bgcolor="#ddffdd"
| May 24 || vs. No. 22 (9) Kentucky || No. 12 (1) || Metropolitan Stadium || 6–5 ||  ||  || None || 8,116 || 40–20 || 3–1
|- bgcolor="#ffdddd"
| May 25 || vs. No. 8 (3) LSU || No. 12 (1) || Metropolitan Stadium || 0–2 || Person (3–1) || Harris (3–2) || McCune (5) || 10,188 || 40–21 || 3–2
|-

|- bgcolor="#ffdddd"
| May 30 ||  ||  || McKethan Stadium || 2–3 || Bauer (6–2) || Shore (7–4) || Hanzik (15) || 1,911 || 40–22 || 0–1
|- bgcolor="#ffdddd"
| May 31 || (3)  ||  || McKethan Stadium || 2–5 || Hovis (9–1) || Poyner (5–4) || None || 1,855 || 40–23 || 0–2
|-

Rankings from USA Today/ESPN Top 25 coaches' baseball poll. All times Eastern. Parenthesis indicate tournament seedings. Retrieved from FloridaGators.com

Gators in the MLB Draft

References

External links
 Gator Baseball official website

Florida Gators baseball seasons
Florida Gators baseball team
Florida Gators
Florida
Southeastern Conference baseball champion seasons